Cabrales is a municipality in the autonomous community of Asturias, northwestern Spain.  It is situated between the Sierra de Cuera and the Picos de Europa, and is a region famous for its Cabrales cheese.

Important towns within the municipality include Arenas de Cabrales, one of the primary objectives of the Battle of El Mazuco in 1937.  Nowadays Arenas' economy seems to be primarily based on tourism, although unlike many tourist centres it retains its authentic style – and hospitality.

Parishes
Cabrales municipality is divided into nine parishes:
Berodia
Bulnes
Carreña
Las Arenas
Poo
Prado (Prau in Asturian)
Puertas
Sotres
Tielve

References

Municipalities in Asturias
Picos de Europa